Galpadar is a village in the Gandhidham Municipal Corporation, within the Kutch District of Gujarat State of India. It is located at a distance of about 3 km from Gandhidham, 11 km from Anjar and 51 km from Bhuj.  An airport is 3 kilometers away, while Kandla Port is 12 km away. The Sag Rand Old Bridge (bar Nala pul) is there.

History
Galpadar was founded by Ahir Community also known as Surname Kangad, Virda of Ahir who built the toran of Galpadar.

The village and old  infrastructure, temples, well, the huge pond named Meghasar Talav, community halls around the villages were built and developed by the Ahir, Jadeja, Jain, and Mistry community in late 18th century.

Until the 1950s Galpadar was the only big village in this barren area of Kutch.  The Government then built Kandla Port and Gandhidham town.  Gandhidham Town.

Demographics 
Much of the population is of the Ahir Community with surnames like Virda, Dangar, and Marand, who have  lived in Galpadar since its founding. The Amar community also lived in Galpadar, migrating from Meghpar Kumbhardi. Other Kutch Gurjar Kshtiya Mistry, and Jain communities migrated for employment and business activity.

Climate
The climate here is desert, with average annual rainfall of only 379 mm. This climate is considered to be BWh according to the Koppen-Geiger classification of climates. The average annual temperature is 24.6c.

Temples
Bhagvan Ram Thakar Temple, Shiva Kalyaneshwar Mahadev Temple, Malara Mahadev Temple, Radha Krishna Temple, Ramdev Pir Temple and Balaji Hanumanji Temple were all built by the village founders. Other village temples are Virda family Surapura dada Shree Sonal Ma Temple Kuldevi of Virda family Ahir Samaj, Nagabava Temple, Kuldevi and Dada - Surapura Temples, Hinglaj Ma Temple, Revachi Mata temple, Ksehtarpal Dada Mandir, Vachhra Dada, and Dargah of Gebansha Pir. In 2011, the migrant Oriya people built a temple of Jagannath. The Jain temple of 23rd Tirthankar, Shri Parshvanath Swami, is located in Galpadar and is approximately 120 years old. It was established by the ancestors of the Vora family and is managed by the family descendants. Vora families Kuddevi Shri Dudhad Maataji Temple and Kshetrapal Dada Temple are also located there.

References

Villages in Kutch district